Oswayo Valley High School is a tiny, rural public high school located at 318 Oswayo Street, Shinglehouse, Potter County, Pennsylvania. In the 2018–2019 school year, its enrollment was reported as 165 pupils, in 9th through 12th grades. The school serves the boroughs of Oswayo and Shinglehouse, as well as Clara Township, Sharon Township, and Oswayo Township. McKean County's Ceres Township is also within district's service boundaries.

Oswayo Valley High School students may choose to attend Seneca Highlands Career and Technical Center for training in the construction and mechanical trades. The Seneca Highlands Intermediate Unit IU9 provides the district with a wide variety of services like specialized education for disabled students and hearing, speech and visual disability services and professional development for staff and faculty. The school is the sole high school operated by the Oswayo Valley School District.

Extracurriculars
Oswayo Valley offers a wide variety of clubs, activities and sports.

Sports
The district funds:

Boys
Baseball - A
Basketball - A
Cross country - AA
Golf - AA
Track and field - AA
Wrestling - AA

Girls
Basketball - A
Cross country - A
Golf - AA
Softball - A
Track and field - AA
Volleyball

Middle school sports

Boys
Basketball
Cross country
Track and field
Wrestling 

Girls
Basketball
Cross country
Track and field
Volleyball 

According to PIAA directory July 2012

References

External links
 Seneca Highlands Intermediate Unit 9
 Pennsylvania Interscholastic Athletic Association (PIAA)

Education in Potter County, Pennsylvania
Public high schools in Pennsylvania
Buildings and structures in Potter County, Pennsylvania